The  Cincinnati Rockers season was the second, and what turned out to be the final season for the arena football franchise. The Rockers finished 2–10 and failed to make the playoffs.

Regular season

Schedule

Standings

z – clinched homefield advantage

y – clinched division title

x – clinched playoff spot

Roster

All-Star selections

References

External links
1993 Cincinnati Rockers on ArenaFan.com

1993 Arena Football League season
1993 in sports in Ohio
Cincinnati Rockers seasons